The Ya'an-Yecheng Expressway, commonly referred to as the Yaye Expressway is an expressway that will traverse the entirety of Tibet and link Ya'an in Sichuan to Yecheng in Xinjiang.

Description
In a unique case for a spur route, when fully completed, its length will be over 4,000 km (1975.508 km between Ya'an and Qüxü alone), much longer than the G42 Shanghai–Chengdu Expressway itself, making it the only spur route in the world to be longer than twice its principal route, the longest spur route in the world, and the second-longest route in the entire NTHS system. The longest national spur route outside China is NH 1A (India) at 663 km, while the G0612 Xining–Hotan Expressway will become the second-longest spur route at roughly 2,400 km.

It's also exceptionally important for a spur route, as it traverses all of Tibet, and without it the entire prefectures of Garzê, Nyingchi, Shannan (via G4219), Xigazê and Ngari wouldn't connect to the NTHS system at all. It is practically an extension of G42, but shares its last two digits with the culturally prestigious China National Highway 318, which parallels it for the Ya'an-Lhatse section, and which in turn is part of AH 42.

Moreover, it does not even connect to G42: the Chengdu-Ya'an section of G5/G93 links them, and together they will create an uninterrupted, non-detouring domestic drive between Shanghai and Kargilik that is over 6,000 km long.

Right now, it has yet to be completed, and only the Ya'an-Kangding section is currently linked to the system, which is currently only 135 km in length. The Qüxü-Lhasa and Lhasa-Nyingchi sections are completed but isolated from the rest of the network.

Background
The Chinese People's Political Consultative Conference conducted research in 2015 showing that despite 60 years of efforts that changed the primitive transportation methods in the Qinghai-Tibetan Plateau, infrastructure is still lacking:

It is considered impractical to construct all sections of the Sichuan-Tibet expressways and railway all at once.

Construction
The following words were used to solely describe the Ya'an-Kangding section, but any section east of Nyingchi and west of Xigazê won't be much easier:

The Ya'an-Kangding section alone climbs 2,000 m of altitude over its 130 km route. The Ya'an-Xichang expressway earned the nickname of "the ladder to heaven" for its steepness, but it still pales in comparison to this section. It's considered at least "extreme on five aspects", namely geography, geology (the region not only being prone to earthquakes, but also difficult to tunnel through), climate, ecology, and engineering challenge. Some people in charge of construction reportedly reacted with disbelief upon first seeing the detailed plan.

The Kangding Bypass section encountered hundreds of rock bursts that affected the safety of the project. Paomashan Tunnel 1 couldn't be constructed as a straight line for not even tunneling straight through mountains could bring steepness down to NTHS expressway standards, having a 220m difference in altitude between its entrance and exit.

Details of people documenting the difficulties encountered in the construction of G4218 is widely available in Chinese but not in other languages. The Lhasa-Nyingchi section has a projected cost of CN¥92 million/km, and for the Kangding-Xinduqiao section the figure is CN¥192 million/km, which is equivalent to US$72 million/mile (PPP, rather than nominal exchange rates), compared to the usual maximum US$9 million/mile for rural expressways.

Ya'an-Kangding Section

135 km long, finished. This section costs CN¥23 billion for 135 km. However, only 130.130 km is on the main line, the rest is linking it to Kangding city center.

Kangding Bypass

Under construction. Has a projected cost of CN¥3.2 billion.

Kangding-Xinduqiao Section

Planning finished. This section has a projected cost of CN¥15.2 billion for 79 km (actual costs may be higher).

Xinduqiao-Nyingchi Section

Planned.

Nyingchi-Lhasa High-Standard Highway

Finished. It has the full characteristics of an expressway, but isn't tolled. This section had a projected cost of CN¥38 billion for 409 km (actual costs may be higher).

G0602 Lhasa Ring Expressway
Long-term plan.

Lhasa Gonggar Airport Expressway

Completed in 2011. The Lhasa City Center-Xierong Interchange section constitutes part of G4218.

Xierong Interchange-Xigazê Peace Airport

Under construction. 166.976 km long. The section east of Qüxü has been completed and it will give a total projected length of 1975.508 km between Ya'an and Qüxü

Xigazê Airport Expressway

Links the airport with the city center. 40.404 km long.

Xigazê-Shiquanhe, Gar County, Ngari Prefecture
Although the Ngari Prefecture is the pole of inaccessibility of China, as of the 2035 plan, all prefectural capitals will be connected to the NTHS without exceptions, meaning that this section is intended to be finished by no later than then.

Shiquanhe, Gar County-Jieshan Pass
Long-term plan.

Jieshan Pass-Yecheng

705 km long. Included in Xinjiang's plan but won't be finished before 2025. The corresponding national highway section is the most dangerous and unmaintainable national standard route in the nation.

References

Chinese national-level expressways
Expressways in Sichuan
Expressways in Tibet
Expressways in Xinjiang